Färjestads Ishall was an arena in Karlstad, Sweden. It was the home arena for the ice hockey team Färjestads BK. It opened on 4 November 1967 with the Swedish top division game Färjestads BK–Djurgårdens IF., where Färjestads BK won, 8–4. For a long time it held 8,000 people during sport events, but the capacity was later reduced to 4,700 when seating became common standard. Löfbergs Lila Arena replaced it as the home of Färjestad.

References

External links
Pictures of arena

Indoor arenas in Sweden
Defunct indoor arenas
Indoor ice hockey venues in Sweden
Former ice hockey venues in Sweden
Buildings and structures in Värmland County
1967 establishments in Sweden
Sports venues completed in 1967
Sport in Karlstad